deca joins is a Taiwanese indie rock band that formed in 2013 in Taipei, Taiwan. The band currently consists of four members: Zheng Jingru (vocals, guitar), Yang Shanghua (guitar), Xie Junyan (bass), and Chen Huanggu (drums). Their music has been described by critics as "indie," "grunge," and "lo-fi."

The band's original name was FUBAR, but in 2016, they changed their name to Gray Dwarf Star (灰矮星), and in 2017, they switched to their current name of deca joins.

History

FUBAR (2013-15) 
In September 2013, Zheng Jingru and a few other students at the Taipei National University of the Arts formed a rock band named FUBAR. The name "FUBAR" stands for "Fucked Up Beyond All Repair."

In April 2014, FUBAR released their first album, entitled Lu Qiang (盧強).  However, the band was put on pause later that year, when the lead singer Zheng Jingru enlisted in Taiwan's mandatory military service.

Grey Dwarf Star (2016-17) 
In January 2016, Zheng Jingru was discharged from military service, and the band re-formed under the new name Gray Dwarf Star (灰矮星). In October 2016, the band released their single "Fashan Chen" (乏善可陳).

Deca Joins (2017-present) 
In January 2017, the band changed their name again to the current "deca joins," which is a combination of the English words "decadent" and "decaffeination." In April 2017, deca joins released the album Bathroom (浴室), which drew wide acclaim in both Taiwan and internationally. The band went on tour to promote the album in Taiwan and Mainland China.

In November 2018, they released the album Go Slow, and went on another tour to promote the album. The popular single from this album, "Wave" (海浪), has received over 1.5 million views on YouTube. In 2019, the music video for the song "Go Slow" was nominated for the Golden Melody Award for Best Music Video.

In October 2019, the band released the single "When Fog Dissipates" (霧散去的時候). They began their tour "In Between Mountains" to promote the single in Asia, Australia, and the United States, but their tour was cancelled midway through due to the COVID-19 pandemic.

In December 2020, deca joins released an album called Bird and Reflections (鳥鳥鳥), for which the band was nominated for the Golden Melody Award for best band. In 2023, the band has since started embarked on another tour called "Reverie's Edge."

Members

Current members

Past members

Discography

Singles and EPs

Albums

References

External links 

 deca joins Official Website
 deca joins on Facebook
 deca joins on YouTube
 deca joins on Instagram

Taiwanese musical groups